Die for You, also known as Die for You/Tha Pethaina Gia Sena in the Greek market, is the name of the second studio album by Greek musical group Antique.  The album was released on 19 June 2001 by V2 Records. A number of the songs are featured on all three of Antique's follow-up albums. "Follow Me (O,ti Theleis)" was used as the first single from Me Logia Ellinika while a Greek version of "Why" was a single from Alli Mia Fora. Other songs from the album were included on the duo's final studio/compilation album Blue Love. "I Agapi Ine Zali", originally "I Agapi Ine Zali (Na Mou To Peis)", is a cover of Haris Alexiou

Track listing

Charts

References 

Albums produced by Nikos Terzis
Antique (band) albums
Greek-language albums
2001 albums
V2 Records albums

pt:Die for you